DWII (90.7 FM), broadcasting as 90.7 Radyo Oragon, is a radio station owned by iTransmission and operated by Mid-tone Broadcasting Network. Its studio are located at Hi-Tone Bldg., Cross Compound, Imperial St., Brgy. Bitano, Legazpi City, and its transmitter is located at Bariw Hill, Brgy. Estanza, Legazpi City.

The frequency was formerly owned by Ago Medical and Educational Center's Institute of Mass Communication from 1988 to 1995.

References

Radio stations in Legazpi, Albay
DWII
2015 establishments in the Philippines